The 1982 All-Ireland Senior Football Championship was the 96th staging of the All-Ireland Senior Football Championship, the Gaelic Athletic Association's premier inter-county Gaelic football tournament. The championship began on 9 May 1982 and ended on 19 September 1982.

It was the last year to date that a Kilkenny team played in the Leinster championship.

Kerry were the defending champions and were hoping to win a record-breaking fifth successive championship title.

Kerry qualified for the final. On 19 September 1982, Offaly won the championship following a 1-15 to 0-17 defeat of Kerry in one of the most dramatic and iconic All-Ireland finals in the history of the championship. This was their third All-Ireland title, their first in ten championship seasons. It remains their last All-Ireland SFC victory.

Offaly's Matt Connor was the championship's top scorer with 0-34. Offaly's Martin Furlong was the choice for Texaco Footballer of the Year.

Results

Connacht Senior Football Championship

Quarter-finals

 

Semi-finals

  

Final

Leinster Senior Football Championship

Preliminary round

 

Quarter-finals

Semi-finals

Final

Munster Senior Football Championship

Quarter-finals
 

Semi-finals

Finals

Ulster Senior Football Championship

Preliminary round

Quarter-finals

Semi-finals

Final

All-Ireland Senior Football Championship

Semi-finals

Final

Championship statistics

Scoring

Overall

Top scorers in a single game

Miscellaneous
 Kilkenny's 4-10 to 2-2 defeat by Kildare in the Leinster preliminary round was their last game in the Leinster Championship as the Kilkenny County Board declined to enter a team in all subsequent championships.
 London decide to play Connacht championship games in a rotational system and are dropped from the Connacht championship draws.
 Offaly stop Kerry from winning a fifth All Ireland title in a row in the All Ireland final.

See also
 "Five in a Row", a song
 Players of the Faithful, a documentary

References